Lotte Chilsung Beverage Co., Ltd. is one of the largest drink manufacturers in South Korea and is part of the Lotte Corporation. The name Chilsung (chilseong) means "Big Dipper" (literally seven stars), and the company's logo is an eponymous seven stars in a row.

History
Since the establishment and successful launch of Chilsung Cider, a lemon-lime soft drink, in 1950, Lotte Chilsung Beverage has been continuously developing and launching products in carbonated drinks, juices, coffee, tea, and water. In 1966, Lotte Chilsung began exporting its Chilsung Cider to Vietnam. In the mid-1970s, the company began to acquire an international presence, entering into contracts with American companies such as Pepsi. In 1989, Lotte Chilsung acquired a JAS mark. In the late 1990s, Lotte Chilsung grew to be largest beverage company in Asia, holding 35% of the domestic market share.

Products

Carbonated drinks

Since its launch in 1950, Chilsung Cider has sold more than one million bottles. Other well-known drinks include milk-soda Milkis, and through the partnership with US-based PepsiCo, Pepsi, Mountain Dew, Mirinda, and Tropicana Sparkling.

Juices

Lotte Chilsung Beverage offers a range of natural fruit juices in orange, grape, apple, tangerine, pear, and mango flavors. In 1982, the company established a partnership with US-based, Del Monte, and now manufactures the Premium Orange and Del Monte Cold products. In 2009, the license for Tropicana was acquired and Tropicana Homemade style blends and other popular choices were produced.

Coffee and tea
The lineup in coffee include Let's Be, South Korea's No. 1 canned coffee; Cantata, a coffee blend made with Arabica beans from plantations worldwide; and black tea drinks Ceylon Tea and Lipton.

Other beverages/bottled water
Diverse assortments range from soy milks to traditional beverage and health drinks. Other varieties in the catalog include the sports drink Gatorade, the carbonated water Trevi, the purified water Icis, and France-imported Evian and Volvic.

Alcoholic drinks
Lotte Chilsung Beverage has been marketing Scotch Blue, Korea's local whiskey brand, along with fruit liquor, traditional Mirin, and other alcoholic beverages. Other alcoholic drinks include Cheoeumcheoreom ("Like the first time"), which is the world's first soju made of alkaline-reduced water, cheongju Baekhwasubok, plum liquor Seoljungmae Plus, and South Korean wine Majuang.

See also
List of South Korean corporations

References

External links

 

Chilsung
South Korean brands
Drink companies of South Korea
Food and drink companies established in 1950
Manufacturing companies based in Seoul
1950 establishments in South Korea
PepsiCo bottlers